There are two species of skink named Bayon's skink:

 Sepsina bayonii
 Trachylepis bayonii